Survival is the eleventh studio album by Bob Marley and the Wailers released in 1979.

Survival is an album with an outwardly militant theme. Some critics speculate that this was due in part to criticism Marley received for the laid-back atmosphere of his previous release, Kaya, which seemed to sidetrack the urgency of his message. In the song "Africa Unite", Marley proclaims Pan-African solidarity. The song "Zimbabwe" is a hymn dedicated to later-independent Rhodesia. The song was performed at Zimbabwe's Independence Celebration in 1980, just after the official declaration of Zimbabwe's independence.

Survival was originally to be called Black Survival to underscore the urgency of African unity, but the name was shortened to prevent misinterpretations of the album's theme.

Track listing

Original Tuff Gong LP

Original Island Records LP

Tuff Gong cassette

Island Records LP re-issue

The Definitive Remastered edition (2001)

Front cover
The album's front cover depicts 48 African flags, 15 of which (in italics) are now obsolete. Zimbabwe (Zimbabwe Rhodesia at the time of the album's release) is represented by two political flags instead of a national flag. The cover also depicts the flag of Papua New Guinea, the only non-African country in the artwork.

Four states already sovereign by the time of the album's release didn't have their flags featured in its cover art:

 
 
 
  (which was under apartheid at the time).

Three states only came to sovereignty after the album's release and thus didn't have their flags included: Eritrea, South Sudan and Namibia.

The album's title appears in white (City typeface) with the Brookes slave ship engraving in the background.

Personnel

Musicians
 Bob Marley – lead vocals, rhythm guitar, acoustic guitar, percussion
 Aston "Family Man" Barrett – bass, rhythm guitar, percussion
 Carlton Barrett – drums, percussion
 Tyrone "Organ D" Downie – keyboards, percussion, backing vocals
 Alvin "Seeco" Patterson – percussion
 Junior Marvin – lead guitar, backing vocals
 Earl "Wire" Lindo – keyboards
 Al Anderson – lead guitar
 Rita Marley – backing vocals
 Marcia Griffiths – backing vocals
 Judy Mowatt – backing vocals
 Carlton "Santa" Davis – drums on "Africa Unite"
 Mikey "Boo" Richards – drums on "Wake Up And Live" 
 Val Douglas – bass on "Wake Up and Live"
 Earl "Chinna" Smith – rhythm guitar and percussion on "One Drop"
 Headley Bennett – alto saxophone
 Ronald "Nambo" Robinson – trombone
 Melba Liston – trombone
 Luther Francois – trombone
 Junior "Chico" Chin – trumpet
 Jackie Willacy – trumpet
 Micky Hanson – trumpet
 Lee Jaffe – harmonica

Production
 Producers – Bob Marley & The Wailers, Alex Sadkin
 Mastering – Ted Jensen at Sterling Sound, NYC

Charts

Certifications

References

Bob Marley and the Wailers albums
Island Records albums
Albums produced by Alex Sadkin
1979 albums
Tuff Gong albums